Gilberto Passani (born April 23, 1961 in Parma, Emilia-Romagna) is a former Italian volleyball player, who earned a total number of 54 caps for the Men's National Team in the late 1980s and early 1990s. He was on the side that won the title at the 1989 European Championships in Sweden.

Currently he is coach of Volley Colico.

References
 Profile

1961 births
Living people
Italian men's volleyball players
Sportspeople from Parma
20th-century Italian people